The 46th Wisconsin Infantry Regiment was a volunteer infantry regiment that served in the Union Army during the American Civil War.

Service
The 46th Wisconsin was organized at Madison, Wisconsin, and mustered into Federal service on March 2, 1865.

The regiment was mustered out on September 27, 1865.

Casualties
The 46th Wisconsin suffered 0 officers and 20 enlisted men who died of disease, for a total of 20 fatalities.

Commanders
 Colonel Frederick S. Lovell

See also

 List of Wisconsin Civil War units
 Wisconsin in the American Civil War

References
The Civil War Archive

Military units and formations established in 1865
Military units and formations disestablished in 1865
Units and formations of the Union Army from Wisconsin
1865 establishments in Wisconsin